Séamus Bourke (born 1957) is an Irish retired hurler who played as a full-forward for the Tipperary senior team.

References 

1957 births
Living people
J.K. Bracken's hurlers
Tipperary inter-county hurlers